Queer Mountain is a conspicuous black mountain (1,180 m; 3,871.4 ft) with steep slopes showing bands of sandstone above the granite, standing 1 mile (1.6 km) west of Killer Ridge, between the Cotton and Miller Glaciers, in Victoria Land. Mapped by the British Antarctic Expedition (1910–13), it was so named because, though surrounded by glacier, it has nearly every rock in the district, including coal beds, represented on its cliffs.

Mountains of Victoria Land
Scott Coast